Stibara is a genus of longhorn beetles of the subfamily Lamiinae, containing the following species:

subgenus Stibara
 Stibara cambodjensis Hayashi, 1964
 Stibara humeralis Thomson, 1865
 Stibara lateralis Thomson, 1865
 Stibara morbillosa (Fabricius, 1798)
 Stibara nigricornis (Fabricius, 1781)
 Stibara nigrovittata Breuning, 1954
 Stibara rufina (Pascoe, 1858)
 Stibara subpunctata Breuning, 1954
 Stibara suturalis Gahan, 1890
 Stibara tetraspilota Hope, 1840
 Stibara tricolor (Fabricius, 1792)

subgenus Tristibara
 Stibara trilineata Hope, 1840

References

Saperdini